Nikola Zugić (born 30 January 1990) is a Serbian footballer who plays for UE Engordany as a midfielder. He also holds Portuguese citizenship.

Football career
On 10 August 2013, Zugić made his professional debut with Farense in a 2013–14 Segunda Liga match against Portimonense replacing Neca (84th minute).

References

External links

Stats and profile at LPFP 

Nikola Zugić at Footballdatabase

1990 births
Portuguese people of Serbian descent
Living people
Serbian footballers
Association football midfielders
Louletano D.C. players
S.C. Farense players
Liga Portugal 2 players
C.D. Santa Clara players
UE Engordany players
C.D.R. Quarteirense players